William Charles Leinhauser (November 4, 1893 – April 14, 1978) played in the outfield for the Detroit Tigers on May 18, 1912, against the Philadelphia Athletics.

Three days earlier, Tigers' star Ty Cobb was taunted with racial slurs in New York by a fan named Claude Lueker.  Cobb lost his cool, went into the stands, and attacked the heckler.  The heckler was handicapped, having lost one complete hand and three fingers from the other hand in an industrial accident, and unable to defend himself.  When fans yelled at Cobb that the man had no hands, Cobb shouted back, "I don't care if he has no feet!"  American League president Ban Johnson responded by suspending Cobb indefinitely.

Cobb's teammates voted to strike in response to Cobb's suspension, declaring that they would not take the field again until Cobb was reinstated.  Ban Johnson refused to back down and told Tigers owner Frank Navin that the team would be fined $5,000 for every game in which they failed to field a team.

Navin ordered manager Hughie Jennings to find players willing to take the field.  The Tigers were on the road in Philadelphia, and so Jennings recruited eight replacement "Tigers" from a neighborhood in North Philadelphia. Each man was paid $25. An 18-year-old Bill Leinhauser was a Philadelphia native who was a noted amateur welterweight boxer.  For one day, Leinhauser switched from boxing to baseball and ended up playing in one of the worst defeats in major league history.

Leinhauser was given the daunting task of taking Ty Cobb's spot in center field for the replacement Tigers.  He went hitless in four at bats but played flawlessly in the outfield with one assist and no errors.  In front of 20,000 Philadelphia fans, the Athletics set a club scoring record in trouncing the replacement Tigers by a score of 24–2.  The Tigers' starting pitcher, Allan Travers was a college student who later confessed he had never pitched a game in his life.  Travers later became a Catholic priest.

After the embarrassing display, Ban Johnson met personally with the striking Tigers and told them they would be banned  for life if the strike continued.  Ty Cobb urged his teammates to end the strike, and the Tigers complied.  Accordingly, the major league career of Bill Leinhauser and the other replacement Tigers was cut short at one game.

A rumor making the rounds in 1912 was that "when Leinhauser's wife found that he had the audacity to replace the great Ty Cobb, she hit him with a skillet." 

By playing in this game, Leinhauser became a small piece of baseball history with his name and "career" statistics recorded forever in the records of Major League Baseball along with Ty Cobb and other legends of the game.

Leinhauser served in France for the U.S. Army during World War I.  When his boxing career came to and end, Leinhauser became a Philadelphia police officer.  He retired as captain of the North Central Detective Division of the Philadelphia Police Department in 1959 after 41 years, 29 in the narcotics squad.

Bill Leinhauser died at age 84 in 1978 in Elkins Park, Pennsylvania.  He is buried at Holy Cross Cemetery in Yeadon, Pennsylvania.

External links
 Baseball-Reference.com
 SABR Biography of "Replacement Tiger" Allan Travers

Detroit Tigers players
Baseball players from Philadelphia
1893 births
1978 deaths
Major League Baseball outfielders